Fox Radio may refer to:

 Fox News Radio, an American radio network programmed by Fox News Channel
 Fox Sports Radio, an international radio network, a service of Premiere Radio Networks
 CKFX-FM, also known as 102 FM The Fox, a Canadian radio station 
 Fox News Talk, a satellite radio channel
 A collection of radio stations owned by Craig Fox (radio host)

See also
Fox FM (disambiguation)